The Great Wicomico River Light was a lighthouse located at the mouth of the Great Wicomico River, south of the Potomac River on the western side of the Chesapeake Bay. It was first lit in 1889 and was deactivated in 1967.

References

Great Wicomico River Light, from the Chesapeake Chapter of the United States Lighthouse Society

Lighthouses completed in 1889
Lighthouses in Virginia
Buildings and structures in Northumberland County, Virginia
Lighthouses in the Chesapeake Bay